Denver is a village and civil parish in the English county of Norfolk.

History
Denver's name is of Anglo-Saxon origin and derives from the Old English for a passage or crossing used by the Danes.

Denver acted as the terminus for the Roman road, the Fen Causeway which began in Peterborough.

In the Domesday Book, Denver is listed as a settlement of 43 households in the hundred of Clackclose. In 1086, the village was part of the estates of William de Warenne.

Denver Sluice controls the water levels between the tidal and non-tidal Great Ouse. In 1651, the first sluice to help with the drainage of The Fens was built by the Dutch architect Cornelius Vermuyden. The sluice was rebuilt after bursting in 1713. John Rennie the Younger built a sluice and bridge in 1834. It was enlarged in 1923 and the flood gates have been replaced several times.The four-arched bridge has its piers extended to form two locks. It is Grade II listed. The West Norfolk Rowing Club is based at Denver Sluice.

Denver Windmill was built in the mid-nineteenth century and today is fully restored.

Denver Railway Station opened in 1847 as a stop on the Great Eastern Railway between King's Lynn and Cambridge. The station to passengers in 1930.

Geography
According to the 2011 Census, Denver is a settlement of 890 residents living in 379 households.

Denver falls within the constituency of South West Norfolk and is represented in Parliament by Liz Truss of the Conservative Party.

St Mary's Church
Denver's parish church is of Norman origin and is dedicated to Saint Mary. The church was heavily remodelled in the later nineteenth century with the stained glass being created and installed by Ian Pace. The church is Grade II listed and holds regular church services.

Famous residents
George William Manby, English author and inventor

In popular culture
In the novels of Dorothy L. Sayers, the fictional Duke of Denver's family seat is supposedly based on the village.

War memorial
Denver shares a war memorial with the nearby villages of Fordham, Ryston and Bexwell located on the village green taking the form of hexagonal stone column topped with a crucifix. The memorial lists the following names for Denver for the First World War:

 Stoker-First Class G. Beck (1890-1916), HMS Queen Mary
 Stoker-First Class Harry Paul (1893-1916), HMS Queen Mary
 Quarter-Master-Sergeant Frederick Armsby (1872-1917), 8th Battalion, Royal Norfolk Regiment
 Sergeant W. Dack (1878-1919), Y Company, Royal Army Service Corps
 Sergeant George R. Day (d.1914), 1st Battalion, Royal Norfolk Regiment
 Sergeant Arthur Day (d.1914), 2nd Battalion, King's Royal Rifle Corps
 Corporal William Hassack DCM (d.1916), 6th (City of London) Battalion, London Regiment
 Lance-Corporal Charles H. Holliday (d.1916), Coldstream Guards
 Lance-Corporal Reginald P. H. Howlett (d.1918), 1st Battalion, Royal West Kent Regiment
 Lance-Corporal E. Scarborough (d.1917), 9th Battalion, Royal Norfolk Regiment
 Private John Garrod (d.1917), 6th Battalion, Border Regiment
 Private Arthur Hilling (1895-1916), 1st Battalion, Coldstream Guards
 Private John W. Hall (d.1918), 1st Battalion, Essex Regiment
 Private Ernest R. B. Chapman (1897-1917), Royal West Kent Regiment
 Private James W. Rodwell (1895-1918), 2/6th Battalion, Manchester Regiment
 Private Robert Fountain (d.1915), 2nd Battalion, Royal Norfolk Regiment
 Private Horace Allcock (1897-1917), 3rd Battalion, Royal Norfolk Regiment
 Private Harold Monk (1895-1914), 1/5th Battalion, Royal Norfolk Regiment
 Private Francis H. Holliday (1885-1916), 8th Battalion, Royal Norfolk Regiment
 Private H. Hurrell (d.1919), 2nd Garrison Battalion, Suffolk Regiment
 Private William E. Fendick (1873-1915), 2nd Battalion, Suffolk Regiment
 Private Horace Sutlefe (d.1917), 9th Battalion, Royal Welch Fusiliers
 Private Thomas Redcar (1899-1918), 1st Battalion, Wiltshire Regiment
 Private William H. Holliday (d.1918), 1st Battalion, Yorkshire Regiment
 Private George Akred (1897-1917), 1/4th Battalion, East Yorkshire Regiment

References

External links

Villages in Norfolk
King's Lynn and West Norfolk
Civil parishes in Norfolk